, known by its short title , is a theological work in Latin by Cornelius Jansen. Published posthumously in Louvain by Jacobus Zegers in 1640, it was in three parts:
On Pelagianism (Dē Hæresī Pelagiana, "Concerning Peligian Heresy")
On original sin (Dē Gratiā Prīmī Hominis, "The Grace of the First Man" and Dē Statū Nātūræ Lāpsæ, "The Fallen State of Nature")
On divine grace (Dē Gratiā Chrīstī Salvātōris, "The Grace of Christ the Savior")
It began with the proposition that Augustine of Hippo was a man chosen by God to reveal the doctrine of grace. Thus, by this logic, any later 
Catholic teaching contrary to Augustine's work should be revised to match it. The text stoked the theological controversies that raged in France and much of Europe after the spread of Jansenism. Five of the books' propositions were condemned as heretical in the apostolic constitution  promulgated in 1653 by Pope Innocent X. In reaction to this condemnation, Blaise Pascal wrote his 17th and 18th Lettres provinciales in 1657. The five propositions were the focus of the Formulary Controversy, a 17th and 18th century recusancy by Jansenists of the Formula of Submission for the Jansenists.

References

Bibliography 
 M. Flick and Z. Alszeghy, Antropología teológica, Ediciones Sígueme, Salamanca, 1971.

External links
 Volumes 1, 2, and 3 combined on Google Books (from Ghent University Library).

Jansenism
1640 books
Books about ancient Christianity
1640 in the Habsburg Netherlands